Kanagawa Station is the name of multiple train stations in Japan.

 Kanagawa Station (Kanagawa) (神奈川駅), in Kanagawa Prefecture
 Kanagawa Station (Okayama) (金川駅), in Okayama Prefecture